Oswaldo Simões Filho (born 12 October 1952) is a Brazilian judoka. He competed in the men's heavyweight event at the 1980 Summer Olympics.

References

1952 births
Living people
Brazilian male judoka
Olympic judoka of Brazil
Judoka at the 1980 Summer Olympics
Sportspeople from Recife
Pan American Games medalists in judo
Pan American Games gold medalists for Brazil
Pan American Games bronze medalists for Brazil
Judoka at the 1979 Pan American Games
20th-century Brazilian people
21st-century Brazilian people